Tam Lok Hin (born 19 January 1991) is a former Hong Kong professional footballer who played as a midfielder. He is currently the assistant coach of Hong Kong Premier League club Tai Po.

Club career

Workable
Tam Lok Hin made his Hong Kong First Division debut on 12 January 2008, in a match against Sun Hei, being substituted in the 70th minutes. However, this was his only league appearance in the season.

Eastern
After Workable was relegated at the end of the 2007–08 season, Tam followed former Workable coach Lee Kin Wo and manager Chan Hiu Ming to Eastern.

He got more chances to break into the Eastern first team during the 2008–09 season. He had made 13 league appearances and scored 3 three league goals. His first league goal was scored on 24 October 2008, helping his team to win 5–0 over Tuen Mun Progoal. He then scored 2 goals in a match for the first team on 15 November 2008, helping his team to win 5–0 over Mutual. However, the club did not achieve good results and decided to return to the Hong Kong Third Division at the end of the season.

Citizen
Tam Lok Hin signed for Citizen in 2009.

He was used as a substitute in the 2010–11 Hong Kong Senior Shield final and scored with a header to make it 3–3 between Citizen and South China. Citizen went on to win the game on penalty shootout.

Lee Man
On 21 May 2018, Lee Man announced that they had signed Tam.

On 2 June 2020, Tam was named on a list of departures from the club. However, on 3 September 2020, Tam was brought back by the club on a short term deal until the end of the 2019–20 season. His contract was further expanded for the 2020–21 season.

International career
Tam Lok Hin was a member of the Hong Kong U-19. He scored 2 goals in AFC U-19 Championship qualifying match against Singapore on 9 November 2009.

3 January 2016, Tam scored a goal for Hong Kong in 38th Guangdong–Hong Kong Cup.

Honours
Citizen
 Hong Kong Senior Shield: 2010–11

Yuen Long
 Hong Kong Senior Shield: 2017–18

Lee Man
 Hong Kong Sapling Cup: 2018–19

Career statistics

Club
As of 11 June 2012

International

Hong Kong U-21
As of 1 February 2011

Hong Kong
As of 18 November 2010

Hong Kong U-23
As of 3 July 2012

References

External links

Tam Lok Hin at HKFA

1991 births
Living people
Hong Kong footballers
Hong Kong international footballers
Eastern Sports Club footballers
Citizen AA players
Yuen Long FC players
Lee Man FC players
Hong Kong First Division League players
Hong Kong Premier League players
Footballers at the 2014 Asian Games
Association football midfielders
Asian Games competitors for Hong Kong
Hong Kong League XI representative players